Angelo Savelli (30 October 1911 – 27 April 1995) was an Italian painter. His work was part of the painting event in the art competition at the 1948 Summer Olympics.

References

Bibliography

Marnicola G., Savelli, Il Messaggero, Roma, 16 September 1936.
Trombadori Antonello, Savelli, Primato, Roma, l April 1941.
Venturoli Marcello, Savelli, Raccolta, Roma, April–May 1941.
Bartolini Luigi, Savelli, Libera Stampa, Lugano, 14 August 1941.
Crespi Attilio, Savelli, Emporium, Bergamo, October 1941.
Piovene Guido, Savelli, Primato, Roma, l October 1941.
Francini Alberto, Savelli, La Tribuna, Roma, 14 December 1941.
Podestà Attilio, Savelli, Il secolo XIX, Genova, 19 April 1942.
Podestà Attilio, Galleria Spiga, Milano, 16-27 Mya 1942.
Guttuso Renato, Savelli, Beltempo, Edizioni della Cometa, Roma 1942.
Guzzi Virgilio, Galleria Il Ritrovo, Roma, 1942.
Bartolini Luigi, Savelli, Corriere Padano, l August 1942.
Repaci Leonida, La quarta Ouadriennale: I pittori, L'Illustrazione Italiana, 23 May 1943.
Bellonzi Fortunato, Savelli, Domenica, Roma, 6 August 1944.
Costes Monotti, A. Presence, Buenos Aires, l June 1945.
Scialoja Toti, Savelli, Mercurio, l0 June 1945.
Venturoli Marcello, Angelo Savelli, L'Universo, 17 November 1945.
Peirce Guglielmo, Turcato e Savelli all'Art Club, L'Unità, 18 November 1945.
Galluppi Enrico, Savelli, Libera Stampa, Lugano, 21 November 1945.
Frattani, Savelli, Il Momento, 23 November 1945.
Ciarletta Nicola, Il Risveglio, Roma, 28 November 1945.
Bucarelli Palma, L'indipendente, Roma, 29 November 1945.
Argan, Giulio Carlo, La Nuova Europa, Roma, 2 December 1945.
Prampolini Enrico, Galleria Cronache, Bologna, 1946 - presentation catalogue.
Costes Monotti, A. Presence, 10 June1946.

1911 births
1995 deaths
20th-century Italian painters
Italian male painters
Olympic competitors in art competitions
People from Pizzo, Calabria
20th-century Italian male artists